Dj Fantan (born Arnold Kamudyariwa) is a Zimbabwean record producer, record executive, DJ and Zimdancehall chanter.

Early life and education 
Dj Fantan was born in Mbare, Harare where he grew up. He attended his early education at Gwinyai Primary School then did his secondary education at George Stark high School where he met his business partner Levels Chillspot.

In 2011, Fantan turned his bedroom set up into a recording studio, establishing Chillspot Recordz with Levels. The duo went on to discover talents from around Zimbabwe through producing riddims which popularised the Zimdancehall genre hence its growth. In 2013, his production with Levels (Zimbo Flavor Riddim) went on to win Riddim of the year. In 2014, they won Conscious Riddim of the year (Pure Niceness) and Best Collaboration Riddim (Mad Levels) then Riddim of the year 2015 (Stage Riddim) at the Zimdancehall Awards.

On 3 January 2021, DJ Fantan and colleagues were arrested for violating COVID-19 regulations after hosting a New Year's Eve bash that attracted thousands of people. Their initial sentence of 12 months jail term was reduced to three months with an option to pay a $2,000 fine each, which they did on conditions of good behaviour from then to 2025.

Mix tape sole productions

Madlevel Riddim 2013
Zimdancehall Mixtape 2013
The Dj Fantan Zimdancehall Mixtape 2014
Zim Lovers Mixtape 2014
Zimdancehall Mixtape 2014

References

Zimbabwean musicians
Living people
1987 births